Eugene "Taffy" O'Callaghan (6 October 1906 – 4 July 1956) was a Welsh professional footballer who played as a forward for Tottenham Hotspur, Leicester City, Fulham and Wales during the 1920s and 1930s.

Career

Club career
Taffy was born in Ebbw Vale, Wales and joined Tottenham Hotspur from Ebbw Vale in 1925, making his debut for the first team in January 1927 against Everton, having impressed with his two-footed play and accurate passing. Again in 1928 he impressed against Everton, scoring four goals in February of that year.

Taffy helped the team achieve promotion back to Football League First Division at the end of the 1932–33 season and in the following year  was a key member of the side known as the 'greyhounds' as they played with speed and style. During his time at Spurs he made 252 league appearances scoring 93 goals and a further six in eleven FA Cup matches for the club.

He was transferred to Leicester City in March 1935 although playing once again for Tottenham as a 'guest' during the war years at the time when the Football League had been suspended. After the war he went on to a coaching role at Fulham.

International career
His first cap for Wales was won in May 1929 and he went on to play a further ten times at International level.

Career statistics

International

Wales score listed first, score column indicates score after each O'Callaghan goal

References

1906 births
1956 deaths
Sportspeople from Ebbw Vale
Welsh footballers
Association football forwards
Wales international footballers
Tottenham Hotspur F.C. players
Leicester City F.C. players
Welsh people of Irish descent